A trope or tropus may refer to a variety of different concepts in medieval, 20th-, and 21st-century music.

The term trope derives from the Greek  (tropos), "a turn, a change", related to the root of the verb  (trepein), "to turn, to direct, to alter, to change". The Latinised form of the word is tropus.

In music, a trope is adding another section, or trope to a plainchant or section of plainchant, thus making it appropriate to a particular occasion or festival.

Medieval music
From the 9th century onward, trope refers to additions of new music to pre-existing chants in use in the Western Christian Church.

Three types of addition are found in music manuscripts:
 new melismas without text (mostly unlabelled or called "trope" in manuscripts)
 addition of a new text to a pre-existing melisma (more often called prosula, prosa, verba or versus)
 new verse or verses, consisting of both text and music (mostly called trope, but also laudes or versus in manuscripts).. The new verses can appear preceding or following the original material, or in between phrases.

O God creator of all things, thou our merciful God eleyson,
we pray to thee, O great king of kings, singing praises together to thee eleyson,
to whom be praise, power, peace and dominion for ever without end eleyson,
O Christ, sole king, O Son coeternal with the kind Father eleyson
who saved mankind, being lost, giving life for death eleyson
lest your pastured sheep should perish, O Jesus, good shepherd eleyson.
Consoler of suppliant spirits below, we beseech thee eleyson,
O Lord, our strength and our salvation for eternity eleyson,
O highest God, grant to us the gifts of eternal life and have mercy upon us eleyson.

The standard Latin-rite ninefold Kyrie is the backbone of this trope. Although the supplicatory format ('eleyson'/'have mercy') has been retained, the Kyrie in this troped format adopts a distinctly Trinitarian cast with a tercet address to the Holy Spirit which is not present in the standard Kyrie. Deus creator omnium is thus a fine example of the literary and doctrinal sophistication of some of the tropes used in the Latin rite and its derived uses in the mediæval period.

20th-century music
In certain types of atonal and serial music, a trope is an unordered collection of different pitches, most often of cardinality six (now usually called an unordered hexachord, of which there are two complementary ones in twelve-tone equal temperament). Tropes in this sense were devised and named by Josef Matthias Hauer in connection with his own twelve-tone technique, developed simultaneously with but overshadowed by Arnold Schoenberg's.

Hauer discovered the 44 tropes, pairs of complementary hexachords, in 1921, allowing him to classify any of the 479,001,600 twelve-tone melodies into one of 44 types.

The primary purpose of the tropes is not analysis (although it can be used for it) but composition. A trope is neither a hexatonic scale nor a chord. Likewise, it is neither a pitch-class set nor an interval-class set. A trope is a framework of contextual interval relations. Therefore, the key information a trope contains is not the set of intervals it consists of (and by no means any set of pitch-classes), it is the relational structure of its intervals.

Each trope contains different types of symmetries and significant structural intervallic relations on varying levels, namely within its hexachords, between the two halves of an hexachord and with relation to whole other tropes.

Based on the knowledge one has about the intervallic properties of a trope, one can make precise statements about any twelve-tone row that can be created from it. A composer can utilize this knowledge in many ways in order to gain full control over the musical material in terms of form, harmony and melody.

The hexachords of trope no. 3 are related by inversion. Trope 3 is therefore suitable for the creation of inversional and retrograde inversional structures. Moreover, its primary formative intervals are the minor second and the major third/minor sixth. This trope contains [0,2,6] twice inside its first hexachord (e.g. F–G–B and G–A–C and [0,4,6] in the second one (e.g. A–C–D and B–D–E). Its multiplications M5 and M7 will result in trope 30 (and vice versa). Trope 3 also allows the creation of an intertwined retrograde transposition by a major second and therefore of trope 17 (e.g., G–A–C–B–F–F–|–E–E–C–D–B–A → Bold pitches represent a hexachord of trope 17).

In general, familiarity with the tropes enables a composer to precisely predetermine a whole composition according to almost any structural plan. For instance, an inversional twelve-tone row from this trope 3 (such as G–A–C–B–F–F–D–C–A–B–E–D) that is harmonized by the [3–3–3–3] method as suggested by Hauer, will result in an equally inversional sequence of sonorities. This will enable the composer, for example, to write an inversional canon or a mirror fugue easily (see example 1). The symmetry of a twelve-tone row can thus be transferred to a whole composition likewise. Consequently, trope technique allows the integration of a formal concept into both a twelve-tone row and a harmonic matrix—and therefore into a whole musical piece.

See also 
 Trope (cantillation), (Yiddish טראָפ), the notation for accentuation and musical reading of the Bible in Jewish religious liturgy

References

Sources

Further reading

 Dewhitt, Mitzi. 2010. The Meaning of the Musical Tree. [USA]: Xlibris Corp. .
 Hansen, Finn Egeland. 1990. "Tropering: Et kompositionsprincip". In Festskrift Søren Sørensen: 1920. 29 September 1990, edited by Finn Egeland Hansen, Steen Pade, Christian Thodberg, and Arthur Ilfeldt, 185–205. Copenhagen: Fog. .
 Hauer, Josef Matthias. 1948. .
 Knapp, Janet. 1990. "Which Came First, the Chicken or the Egg?: Some Reflections on the Relationship between Conductus and Trope". In Essays in Musicology: A Tribute to Alvin Johnson, edited by Lewis Lockwood and Edward Roesner. [Philadelphia?]: American Musicological Society. .
 Perle, George. 1991. Serial Composition and Atonality: An Introduction to the Music of Schoenberg, Berg, and Webern, sixth edition, revised. Berkeley: University of California Press. .
 Sedivy, Dominik. 2012. Tropentechnik. Ihre Anwendung und ihre Möglichkeiten. Salzburger Stier 5. Würzburg: Königshausen & Neumann. .
 Sengstschmid, Johann. 1980. Zwischen Trope und Zwölftonspiel: J. M. Hauers Zwölftontechnik in ausgewählten Beispielen. Forschungsbeiträge zur Musikwissenschaft 28. Regensburg: G. Bosse. .
 Summers, William John. 2007. "To Trope or Not to Trope?: or, How Was That English Gloria Performed?" In Music in Medieval Europe: Studies in Honour of Bryan Gillingham, edited by Terence Bailey and Alma Santosuosso. Aldershot, England; Burlington, Vermont: Ashgate Publishers. .

Christian music
Formal sections in music analysis
Twelve-tone technique